Bannock Creek is a  long tributary of the Snake River Power and Onieda counties in Idaho, United States, that is a tributary of the Snake River.

Description
Bannock Creek has a  watershed.

See also

 List of rivers of Idaho
 List of longest streams of Idaho

References

External links

Rivers of Power County, Idaho
Rivers of Oneida County, Idaho
Rivers of Idaho
Tributaries of the Snake River